The following articles contain lists of separatist movements:

 Lists of active separatist movements
 List of historical separatist movements